Ted Smith is a former American football guard who played for the Ohio State Buckeyes football team, and was recognized as a consensus All-American in 1975.

Early life
Smith graduated from Gibsonburg High School in Gibsonburg, Ohio.    At Gibsonburg, he earned nine letters in various sports and was team captain of both the basketball and football team.  In football, he played both ways as a running back and linebacker. In his senior year he earned several honors including being named All-Ohio and High School All-American.

College career
Smith played for the Ohio State Buckeyes football team under coach Woody Hayes during the 1972, 1973, 1974 and 1975 seasons, lettering in the last three years.   He played linebacker at first but switched to guard  at the beginning of  his junior year.   Following his senior year, as a 6-foot, 1-inch, 242-pound guard, he was recognized as a consensus first-team All-American, having received first-team honors from several publications and organizations including the Football Writers Association of America, and Associated Press.

Later life
Smith spent 31 years in highway construction as a superintendent until he retired at age 55.

References

Year of birth missing (living people)
Living people
American football offensive guards
Ohio State Buckeyes football players
All-American college football players
People from Sandusky County, Ohio
Players of American football from Ohio